Pethia poiensis is a species of cyprinid fish in the genus Pethia.

References

poiensis